Flintshire is a county in the north-east of Wales.

The Cadw/ICOMOS Register of Parks and Gardens of Special Historic Interest in Wales was established in 2002 and given statutory status in 2022. It is administered by Cadw, the historic environment agency of the Welsh Government.  It includes just under 400 sites, ranging from gardens of private houses, to cemeteries and public parks. Parks and gardens are listed at one of three grades, matching the grading system used for listed buildings. Grade I is the highest grade, for sites of exceptional interest; Grade II*, the next highest, denotes parks and gardens of more than special interest; while Grade II denotes nationally important sites of special interest.

There are 24 registered parks and gardens in Flintshire. Two are listed at grade I, six at grade II*, and 16 at grade II.

List of parks and gardens 

|}

See also 

 List of scheduled monuments in Flintshire
 Grade I listed buildings in Flintshire
 Grade II* listed buildings in Flintshire

Notes

References 

Flintshire
Flintshire